Austin Panchot (born September 24, 1996) is a retired American professional soccer player.

Career

College
Panchot played four years of college soccer at Indiana University between 2015 and 2018, making a total of 82 appearances for the Hoosiers, scoring 13 goals and tallying 9 assists. In his senior season, he helped lead the Hoosiers to the NCAA tournament semifinals, scoring two game-winning goals during their run.

Professional
On January 9, 2019, Panchot chose to sign with North Carolina FC of the USL Championship.

He scored a goal during an international exhibition game on March 23, 2019 against Club Necaxa. He made his professional debut in a U.S. Open Cup game against the Richmond Kickers on May 15. He made his USL league debut on June 8 in a win over the Tampa Bay Rowdies.

On January 14, 2020, he was announced as part of the roster for USL League One side Union Omaha's inaugural season.

Personal life
Panchot played youth soccer for St. Louis Scott Gallagher Soccer Club. His father, Jeff, played college soccer at North Carolina State. He faced his brother, Logan, in the 2017 NCAA Division I Men's Soccer Championship Game; Logan's Stanford team beat Austin's Indiana team in the game.

While at Indiana, he majored in marketing.

References

1996 births
Living people
American soccer players
Association football midfielders
Indiana Hoosiers men's soccer players
North Carolina FC players
Soccer players from St. Louis
Union Omaha players
USL Championship players
USL League Two players